María Antonella Ferradans Cayetano (born 2 May 2001), known as Antonella Ferradans, is a Uruguayan footballer who plays as a left back for Club Nacional de Football and the Uruguay women's national team.

International career
Ferradans represented Uruguay at the 2018 FIFA U-17 Women's World Cup. She made her senior debut on 23 May 2019.

References 

2001 births
Living people
Women's association football fullbacks
Uruguayan women's footballers
Uruguay women's international footballers
Club Nacional de Football players
C.A. Progreso players